Trendelburg is a town in the district of Kassel, in Hesse, Germany with a population of 5,282 on 30 September 2009.

The town is twinned with Pocklington, England.

Trendelburg is located on the German Timber-Frame Road.

References

External links 
 Official Website 

Kassel (district)